William Burke may refer to:

 William Burke (pirate) (died 1699), Irish pirate active in the Caribbean, associate of William Kidd
 William Burke (Burke and Hare murders) (1792–1829), Irish-Scots serial killer
 William Burke (author) (1729–1798), English pamphleteer
 William J. Burke (1862–1925), American politician and businessman
 William Burke (baseball) (1865–1939), 19th-century baseball player
 William L. Burke (1941–1996), astronomy, astrophysics, and physics professor at UC Santa Cruz
 William Burke Miller (1904–1983), newspaper and radio reporter
 William Burke (prior) (c. 1611–c. 1685), Irish Dominican
 William Malachy Burke (1819–1879), Irish physician and Registrar General
 William H. Burke, head coach of the College of William & Mary's football team in 1899
 William H. Burke Jr. (1906–1975), American political figure
 William mac Ulick Burke, 4th Clanricarde or Mac William Uachtar (d. 1430), Irish chieftain and noble
 William Burke, 7th Earl of Clanricarde (died 1687), Irish peer
 William Burke, Lord of Bealatury (fl. 1580s-1616), Irish noble and soldier
 Willie Burke (born 1972), former Irish footballer
 William Burke-White, American law professor and policy advisor

See also
Billy Burke (disambiguation)
William de Burgh (disambiguation), once used interchangeably with Burke
William Burgh (disambiguation), once used interchangeably with Burke